F84 or F-84 may refer to;

 F-84 Thunderjet, an early American straight-wing jet fighter
 F-84F Thunderstreak, a swept-wing development of the Thunderjet
 XF-84H Thunderscreech, a turboprop variant of the Thunderstreak
 HMS Exmouth, a Blackwood class frigate